Héctor Rodríguez Castro (born March 26, 1982) is a Venezuelan lawyer and politician. He is currently the governor of Miranda.

Political career
On 9 January 2014, he was appointed as Minister of Popular Power for Education until his dismissal on 4 September 2015 to be a candidate for deputy to the National Assembly of Venezuela. He was elected deputy list by the Bolívar state for the period 2016–2021 in the parliamentary elections of 6 December 2015 by the Great Patriotic Pole. He won the regional elections in Miranda in 2017.

References

1982 births
Living people
21st-century Venezuelan lawyers
Governors of Miranda (state)
Members of the National Assembly (Venezuela)
Central University of Venezuela alumni
United Socialist Party of Venezuela politicians
Education ministers of Venezuela
Secretariat of the Presidency ministers of Venezuela